Mia Katherine Zapata (August 25, 1965 – July 7, 1993) was an American musician who was the lead singer for the Seattle punk band The Gits. After gaining praise in the emerging grunge scene, Zapata was murdered in 1993 while on her way home from a music venue, at age 27. The crime went unsolved for a decade before her killer, Jesus Mezquia, was arrested in 2003. Mezquia was tried, convicted and sentenced to 36 years in prison.

Life and career

Mia Zapata was raised in Louisville, Kentucky, and attended high school at Presentation Academy. Zapata learned how to play the guitar and the piano by age nine, and was influenced by punk rock as well as jazz, blues, and R&B singers such as Bessie Smith, Billie Holiday, Jimmy Reed, Ray Charles, Hank Williams, and Sam Cooke.

In 1984, Zapata enrolled at Antioch College in Yellow Springs, Ohio as a liberal arts student. In September 1986, she and three friends formed the punk rock band The Gits. In 1989, the band relocated to Seattle, Washington. Zapata found a job at a local bar and the four band members moved into an abandoned house they called "The Rathouse." The band released a series of well-received singles on local independent record labels from 1990 to 1991. As the Gits were making a name for themselves in the local music scene, they often played shows with their friends' band, 7 Year Bitch. In 1992, the band released its debut album Frenching the Bully. Their reputation progressively increased within the grunge scene in Seattle, before the band began work on their second and final album Enter: The Conquering Chicken, released in 1993.

Zapata came from an affluent family but often lived without material comforts. As her father described it: "Mia [lived] in two different worlds. She lived on two different sides of the street—the straight side on one, with parochial schools, an affluent family, and tennis clubs. But when she crossed the street, material things didn't mean anything to her." Zapata's music often led to a rejection of financial comfort, but regardless of status, Valerie Agnew describes Mia as "commanding respect and interest immediately".

Zapata was well connected to her community. Peter Sheehy recalls: "Mia [was] the hub of several social circles; a magnetic personality who drew all sorts of people together who otherwise might never have met." On his way to her funeral, Zapata's father became lost and recalls many people carrying yellow roses: the admission ticket to her service. Judge Sharon Armstrong, the judge during her killer's trial, highlighted Zapata as an "extraordinarily vibrant" girl, who was "obviously talented"; she was "struck by how closely Zapata had connected to so many people".

The Gits
The Gits, who included guitarist Andrew "Joe Spleen" Kessler, drummer Steve Moriarty, and bassist Matt Dresdner, met in Ohio in 1986. A few years later, the band decided to move to Seattle to engage in city's burgeoning music scene. The band quickly developed a following within the local underground punk scene. The band as a whole and Zapata in particular became popular with the Seattle feminist community.

In 1990 the Gits went on a successful international tour without the support of a record label. In 1992, their first independent album, Frenching the Bully, was released. The album had hits such as "Another Shot of Whiskey", "Second Skin", and "Here's to Your Fuck", receiving positive reviews. The band had planned a large U.S. and European tour as well a series of local shows and was being courted by various labels. Before the band could finish and release their second album, Enter: The Conquering Chicken, Zapata was murdered. After her death, the band continued to make music and found success in their second album with singles such as "Seaweed" and "Precious Blood".

Murder and investigation

Around 2 a.m. on July 7, 1993, Zapata left the Comet Tavern in the Capitol Hill area of Seattle. She stayed at a studio space in the basement of an apartment building located a block away, and briefly visited a friend who lived on the second floor. This was the last time Zapata was seen alive. She may have walked a few blocks west, or north to a friend's apartment, or may have decided to take the long walk south to her home.

Zapata's body was discovered near the intersection of 24th Avenue South and South Washington Street at around 3:30 a.m, located in Seattle's Central District. She had been beaten, raped, and strangled. It is believed she encountered her attacker shortly after 2:15 a.m. Her body was not initially identified as she had no identification on her when she was found. An episode of the cable television show Forensic Files revealed that she was identified after the medical examiner, who was a fan of the Gits and had been to their concerts, recognized her. According to the medical examiner, if she had not been strangled, she would have died from the internal injuries suffered from the beating. According to court documents, an autopsy found evidence of a struggle in which Zapata suffered blunt impact to her abdomen and a lacerated liver.

Zapata is interred at Cave Hill Cemetery in her hometown of Louisville. The Seattle music community, including its most famous bands – Nirvana, Pearl Jam, and Soundgarden – helped raise $70,000 to hire a private investigator for three years. The funds dried up without any major breaks in the case, but the investigator, Leigh Hearon, continued to investigate on her own time. In 1998, after five years of investigation, Seattle police detective Dale Tallman said: "We're no closer to solving the case than we were right after the murder."

Arrest and trial
In 2003, Florida fisherman Jesus Mezquia, who had come from Cuba in 1980 in the Mariel boatlift, was arrested and charged in connection with Zapata's murder based on DNA evidence. A DNA profile was extracted from saliva found in bite marks on Zapata's body and kept in cold storage until the STR technology was developed for full extraction. An original entry in 2001 failed to generate a positive result, but Mezquia's DNA entered the national CODIS database after he was arrested in Florida for burglary and domestic abuse in 2002. 

Mezquia had a history of violence toward women including domestic abuse, burglary, assault, and battery. All of his ex-girlfriends, and his wife, had filed reports against him. There was also a report of indecent exposure on file against him in Seattle within two weeks of Zapata's murder. However, there was no known prior link between Mezquia and Zapata.

Mezquia did not testify in his own defense and maintained his innocence. The prosecution theory was that he saw Zapata leave the bar and followed her a short distance before he attacked her. Her headphones covered her ears so she would have been unaware of any danger until he grabbed her and dragged her to his car, where he assaulted her in the back seat. Mezquia was convicted in 2004 and initially sentenced to 37 years. On appeal he was given a sentence of 36 years, beginning in January 2003. Mezquia died in a Washington hospital on January 21, 2021, at the age of 66.

Aftermath
In the aftermath of Zapata's murder, friends created a self-defense group called Home Alive. Home Alive organized benefit concerts and released albums with the participation of many bands, including Nirvana, Pearl Jam, Soundgarden, Heart, and the Presidents of the United States of America. Joan Jett also recorded an album with the surviving members of the Gits called Evil Stig ("Gits Live" backwards). The Home Alive group's instructors offered a range of courses, from anger management and use of pepper spray to the martial arts.

In 2005 a documentary film, The Gits Movie, was produced about Zapata's life, the Gits, and the Seattle music scene. Its first showing occurred at the Seattle International Film Festival in May of that same year. Another version of the film appeared two years later at the 2007 SXSW (South By Southwest) Film Festival. The final cut was released theatrically in over 20 North American cities on July 7, 2008, the 15th memorial anniversary of Zapata's death. The following day the film was released on DVD along with a Best of the Gits CD (both from Liberation Entertainment).

¡Viva Zapata!, by punk band 7 Year Bitch, was released in June 1994, on C/Z Records in Seattle, as a tribute to Zapata. Some of the songs on the album address the issue of Zapata's murder directly. Following her death, Jett and Kathleen Hanna wrote a song called "Go Home" that was later released on Jett's 1994 album, Pure and Simple. Later, a video for "Go Home" was released which depicts a woman who is being stalked and attacked but is then able to defend herself against the assailant.

In February 2013, a play called These Streets, inspired by the stories of and featuring music by Zapata and other female musicians in Seattle, debuted at ACT theatre in Seattle.

Zapata's death caused a sense of defeat and fear within the Seattle community. The Seattle Times marked the murder as the moment "the Seattle scene lost its sense of invincibility." Cristen Storm recalls Zapata's death as a reality check, stating: "[They were] all very tough people and as a group of women, [they] are all really strong, outspoken, and hard-hitting, very opinionated women and that perception of, 'We're not victims at all in any way and this can't happen to women that aren't victims,' and I think [Zapata's death] shattered that myth for us, [and showed] that it happens to all types of women."

Zapata is often cast as a symbol for feminist activism, a martyr, and an angel. Dresdner said "[Mia] was sainted, and that was very peculiar... she became this icon for feminism and all kinds of things that she had very little to do with in her actual life." Margaret O'Neil Girouard, who wrote her thesis on Zapata, believes she is an example of women artists being classified based on the perceived motivations behind their art. Moriarty wrote that "[Mia wanted] to relate to people on a personal level in her lyrics [rather] than on a political level." It has been speculated that this association may be due to her presence as a "charismatic female musician" in the Northwest, who was performing throughout the emergence of the riot grrrl movement.

References

Further reading
 Johnson, Tracy. "11 years later, justice for slain singer Zapata". Seattle Post-Intelligencer. March 26, 2004.

External links
 
 
 

1965 births
1993 deaths
American punk rock singers
Antioch College alumni
Burials at Cave Hill Cemetery
Deaths by strangulation in the United States
Violence against women in the United States
Women punk rock singers
American murder victims
Musicians from Louisville, Kentucky
Singers from Washington (state)
People murdered in Washington (state)
20th-century American singers
Singers from Kentucky
Rock musicians from Kentucky
Kentucky women musicians
20th-century American women singers